Dante Moore (born May 24, 2005) is an American football quarterback for the University of California, Los Angeles.

Early life and high school
Moore was born in East Cleveland, Ohio and grew up in nearby Elyria. He later moved to Detroit, Michigan and attended Martin Luther King High School (MLK). He weighed 155 pounds as a freshman and gained 50 pounds over the next two seasons. Moore passed for 3,044 yards with 40 touchdowns against three interceptions during his junior season while MLK won the Division III state championship. Moore led MLK to a second straight state title as a senior while passing for 2,392 yards and 32 touchdowns with three interceptions. He was selected to play in the 2023 All-American Bowl. Moore finished his high school career with 9,880 passing yards and 135 touchdown passes.

Moore was rated the best recruit in his class by Sports Illustrated. He initially committed to play college football at Oregon entering his senior year. Moore had the option to meet with Oregon's Name, Image and Likeness (NIL) collectives during his official visit, but opted against doing so. Moore flipped his commitment to UCLA . He is the highest-rated quarterback to ever commit to play for the Bruins. Moore signed his National Letter of Intent to UCLA on December 21, 2022.

References

Living people
2005 births
Players of American football from Michigan
American football quarterbacks